YES Prep Northline is a charter middle school. It is a part of the YES Prep network, the 17th campus. The mascot is Revolutionaries.

It will open in 2017 with 6th grade students. Its  school facility was originally a hospital which opened in the early 1960s. St. Stephens Baptist Church acquired it in 2000, and Yes Prep acquired it in 2016. It is in proximity to Northline Elementary School. It opened in the 2017–2018 school year with 6th grade students. It is serving 6th through 8th graders in the 2019–2020 school year. By 2024, YES Prep Northline will graduate its first class of 12th grade students (seniors). The school is on 5815 Arline Dr.

See also
 List of state-chartered charter schools in Houston

References

External links
 Yes Prep Northline

Charter schools in Houston
Middle schools in Houston
Charter high schools in Houston
Middle schools in Harris County, Texas
High schools in Harris County, Texas